In mathematics, the exponential integral Ei is a special function on the complex plane.
It is defined as one particular definite integral of the ratio between an exponential function and its argument.

Definitions
For real non-zero values of x, the exponential integral Ei(x) is defined as

The Risch algorithm shows that Ei is not an elementary function.  The definition above can be used for positive values of x, but the integral has to be understood in terms of the Cauchy principal value due to the singularity of the integrand at zero.

For complex values of the argument, the definition becomes ambiguous due to branch points at 0 and  Instead of Ei, the following notation is used,

For positive values of x, we have 

In general, a branch cut is taken on the negative real axis and E1 can be defined by analytic continuation elsewhere on the complex plane.

The behaviour of E1 near the branch cut can be seen by the following relation:

Properties
Several properties of the exponential integral below, in certain cases, allow one to avoid its explicit evaluation through the definition above.

Convergent series

For real or complex arguments off the negative real axis,  can be expressed as

where  is the Euler–Mascheroni constant. The sum converges for all complex , and we take the usual value of the complex logarithm having a branch cut along the negative real axis.

This formula can be used to compute  with floating point operations for real  between 0 and 2.5. For , the result is inaccurate due to cancellation.

A faster converging series was found by Ramanujan:

These alternating series can also be used to give good asymptotic bounds for small x, e.g. :

Asymptotic (divergent) series

Unfortunately, the convergence of the series above is slow for arguments of larger modulus. However, for positive values of x, there is a divergent series approximation that can be obtained by integrating  by parts:
 

Exponential and logarithmic behavior: bracketing

From the two series suggested in previous subsections, it follows that  behaves like a negative exponential for large values of the argument and like a logarithm for small values. For positive real values of the argument,  can be bracketed by elementary functions as follows:

The left-hand side of this inequality is shown in the graph to the left in blue; the central part  is shown in black and the right-hand side is shown in red.

Definition by Ein

Both  and  can be written more simply using the entire function  defined as

(note that this is just the alternating series in the above definition of ). Then we have

Relation with other functions
Kummer's equation

is usually solved by the confluent hypergeometric functions  and  But when  and  that is,

we have

for all z. A second solution is then given by E1(−z). In fact,

with the derivative evaluated at  Another connexion with the confluent hypergeometric functions is that E1 is an exponential times the function U(1,1,z):

The exponential integral is closely related to the logarithmic integral function li(x) by the formula

Generalization
The exponential integral may also be generalized to

which can be written as a special case of the upper incomplete gamma function:

 

The generalized form is sometimes called the Misra function , defined as

Many properties of this generalized form can be found in the NIST Digital Library of Mathematical Functions.

Including a logarithm defines the generalized integro-exponential function

The indefinite integral:

Derivatives

The derivatives of the generalised functions  can be calculated by means of the formula 

Note that the function  is easy to evaluate (making this recursion useful), since it is just .

Exponential integral of imaginary argument

If  is imaginary, it has a nonnegative real part, so we can use the formula

to get a relation with the trigonometric integrals  and :

Approximations 
There have been a number of approximations for the exponential integral function. These include:

 The Swamee and Ohija approximation  where        
 The Allen and Hastings approximation   where 
 The continued fraction expansion  
 The approximation of Barry et al.   where:  with  being the Euler–Mascheroni constant.

Applications 
 Time-dependent heat transfer
 Nonequilibrium groundwater flow in the Theis solution (called a well function)
 Radiative transfer in stellar and planetary atmospheres
 Radial diffusivity equation for transient or unsteady state flow with line sources and sinks
 Solutions to the neutron transport equation in simplified 1-D geometries

See also
 Goodwin–Staton integral
 Bickley–Naylor functions

Notes

References
 , Chapter 5.

External links 
 
 NIST documentation on the Generalized Exponential Integral

 
 Exponential, Logarithmic, Sine, and Cosine Integrals in DLMF. 

Exponentials
Special functions
Special hypergeometric functions
Integrals